Songs for Love is a solo album by pianist Tete Montoliu. It wasrecorded in 1971 and released on the German label Enja in 1974.

Reception

Ken Dryden of AllMusic said "the pianist is in great form throughout the date."

Track listing
All compositions by Tete Montoliu except where noted
 "Rainy Day" (Jimmy Van Heusen, Johnny Burke) – 5:17		
 "Django" (John Lewis) – 5:41
 "Two Catalan Songs" (Joan Manuel Serrat) – 5:34
 "Gentofte" – 3:52
 "Apartment 512" – 7:40
 "Autumn In New York" (Vernon Duke) – 5:54
 "Ballad For Line" – 5:33
 "Little Camilla" – 3:47

Personnel
Tete Montoliu – piano

References

Tete Montoliu albums
1974 albums
Enja Records albums
Solo piano jazz albums